Tord Gudmestad (born 8 May 2001) is a Norwegian professional road cyclist, who currently rides for UCI ProTeam .

Major results

2018
 1st  Road race, National Junior Road Championships
2020
 7th Gylne Gutuer
 10th Hafjell GP
2021
 1st  Road race, National Under-23 Road Championships
 1st International Rhodes Grand Prix
 Dookoła Mazowsza
1st Points classification
1st Stages 2 & 3
 2nd Puchar Ministra Obrony Narodowej
 4th Himmerland Rundt
 5th Overall Orlen Nations Grand Prix
2022
 1st  Mountains classification, Tour Poitou-Charentes en Nouvelle-Aquitaine
 1st Grand Prix Megasaray

References

External links

2001 births
Living people
Norwegian male cyclists
People from Hå
Sportspeople from Rogaland